Louis Paul Leroy (February 18, 1879 – October 10, 1944) was a pitcher in Major League Baseball who played from  through  for the New York Highlanders (1905–06) and Boston Red Sox (1910).

He was born in Omro, Wisconsin and was a member of the Stockbridge–Munsee Community.

In a three-season career, Leroy posted a 3–1 record with 39 strikeouts and a 3.22 ERA in 15 appearances, including five starts, three complete games, one save, and 72⅔ innings of work.

Prior to his baseball career Leroy was a running back at Carlisle Indian School.

Leroy died in Shawano, Wisconsin at age 65.

References

External links

Retrosheet

Boston Red Sox players
New York Highlanders players
Major League Baseball pitchers
Baseball players from Wisconsin
1879 births
1944 deaths
People from Omro, Wisconsin
Buffalo Bisons (minor league) players
Montreal Royals players
St. Paul Saints (AA) players
Indianapolis Indians players
Salt Lake City Bees players
Muskegon Reds players
Springfield Ponies players
La Crosse Infants players
Joplin Miners players
Seattle Giants players
Mitchell Kernels players
People from Shawano, Wisconsin
Native American people from Wisconsin
Native American baseball players